was a Japanese daimyō and one of the leading figures of the Sengoku period.  He is regarded as the first "Great Unifier" of Japan.

Nobunaga was head of the very powerful Oda clan, and launched a war against other daimyō to unify Japan in the 1560s. Nobunaga emerged as the most powerful daimyō, overthrowing the nominally ruling shogun Ashikaga Yoshiaki and dissolving the Ashikaga Shogunate in 1573. He conquered most of Honshu island by 1580, and defeated the Ikkō-ikki rebels in the 1580s. Nobunaga's rule was noted for innovative military tactics, fostering of free trade, reforms of Japan's civil government, and the start of the Momoyama historical art period, but also for the brutal suppression of those who refused to cooperate or yield to his demands. Nobunaga was killed in the Honnō-ji Incident in 1582, when his retainer Akechi Mitsuhide ambushed him in Kyoto and forced him to commit . Nobunaga was succeeded by Toyotomi Hideyoshi, who along with Tokugawa Ieyasu completed his war of unification shortly afterwards.

Nobunaga was an influential figure in Japanese history and is regarded as one of the three great unifiers of Japan, along with his retainers Toyotomi Hideyoshi and Tokugawa Ieyasu. Hideyoshi later united Japan in 1591, and invaded Korea a year later. However, he died in 1598, and Ieyasu took power after the Battle of Sekigahara in 1600, becoming shogun in 1603, and ending the Sengoku period.

Early life (1534–1551)

Oda Nobunaga was born on 23 June 1534 in Nagoya, Owari Province, and was the second son of Oda Nobuhide, the head of the powerful Oda clan and a deputy  (military governor), and his wife Tsuchida Gozen. Nobunaga is said to have been born in Nagoya Castle, the future seat of the Owari Domain, although this is subject to debate. Nobunaga was a clear speaker with a strong presence about him, and was known to run around with other youths from the area, without any regard to his own rank in society. With the introduction of firearms into Japan he became known for his fondness for  guns.

In 1549, Nobuhide made peace with Saitō Dōsan by arranging a political marriage between his son and heir Nobunaga, and Saitō Dōsan's daughter, Nōhime. Dōsan therefore became Nobunaga's father-in-law.

Unification of Owari (1551–1560)

Succession crisis

In 1551, Oda Nobuhide died unexpectedly. It has been said that Nobunaga acted outrageously during his funeral, throwing ceremonial incense at the altar. Although Nobunaga was Nobuhide's legitimate heir, a succession crisis occurred when some of the Oda clan opposed him. Nobunaga, collecting about 1,000 men, suppressed the hostile members of his family and their allies. However, Imagawa Yoshimoto sent an army under the command of Imagawa Sessai. The army laid siege to Anjō castle, where Oda Nobuhiro, the illegitimate son of Nobuhide and eldest brother of Nobunaga, was living. Nobuhiro was trapped, but was saved when Nobunaga handed over one of his hostages at Honshōji temple, nine-year-old Matsudaira Takechiyo – later known as Tokugawa Ieyasu – to make up for not lifting the siege of Anjō. Later on, Nobuhiro plotted against Nobunaga with the assistance of Saitō Yoshitatsu, but Nobunaga forgave Nobuhiro after the plot failed.

In early 1552, barely several months after his father's death, one of Oda's senior retainers, Yamaguchi Noritsugu and his son Yamaguchi Noriyoshi defected to the Imagawa clan. In response, Nobunaga attacked Noritsugu, but was repelled by Noriyoshi at Battle of Akatsuka; he retreated and left contested lands in eastern Owari under Imagawa control.

Consolidation of clan leadership

In spring 1552, Nobuhide's younger brother, Oda Nobutomo, attacked Nobunaga domain with the support of Shiba Yoshimune, the official governor of Owari province. Nobunaga repelled it and burned the outskirts of Kiyosu castle.

In 1553, Hirate Masahide, a valuable mentor and retainer to Nobunaga, performed  to startle Nobunaga into his obligations. In the meantime, Shiba Yoshimune informed Nobunaga of a plot of Nobutomo to assassinate him, and later, Oda Nobutomo had Yoshimune put to death. Nobunaga mobilized his forces to blockade Kiyosu castle, and waited for the opportunity to attack.

In 1554 Nobunaga defeated the powerful Imagawa clan, whose army had invaded eastern Owari Province, at the Battle of Muraki Castle. After recapturing eastern Owari, Nobunaga then turned his attention back to attacking Kiyosu castle, where he defeated and captured his uncle, Oda Nobutomo, and forced him to commit suicide.

In 1556, Nobunaga sent an army to Mino Province to aid his father-in-law, Saitō Dōsan, after Dōsan's son, Saitō Yoshitatsu, turned against him. The campaign failed, as Dōsan was killed in the Battle of Nagara-gawa, and Yoshitatsu became the new master of Mino. Later, Nobunaga defeated his main rival as head of the Oda clan, his younger brother Oda Nobuyuki, at the Battle of Ino. Nobuyuki survived the battle and began plotting a second rebellion.

Nobuyuki began his second rebellion in 1557, but was defeated and his Suemori Castle was destroyed by Nobunaga's retainer Ikeda Nobuteru. 

In 1558, Nobunaga sent an army to protect Suzuki Shigeteru, lord of Terabe Castle, during the Siege of Terabe. Shigeteru had defected to Nobunaga's side from Imagawa Yoshimoto, a daimyō from Suruga Province, one of the most powerful men in the Tōkaidō region. In the meantime, Nobunaga defeated Oda Nobukata at the Battle of Ukino. Oda Nobuyuki started plotting again, but was denounced by Shibata Katsuie, one of his retainers, and killed on November 2, 1558.

By 1559, Nobunaga had captured and destroyed Iwakura Castle, eliminated all opposition within the Oda clan, and established his uncontested rule in Owari Province.

Rise to power (1560–1568)

Conflict with Imagawa

Imagawa Yoshimoto was a long-time opponent of Nobunaga's father, and had sought to expand his domain into Oda territory in Owari.  In 1560, Imagawa Yoshimoto gathered an army of 25,000 men, and marched toward the capital city of Kyoto, with the pretext of aiding the frail Ashikaga Shogunate. The Matsudaira clan also joined Yoshimoto's forces. The Imagawa forces quickly overran the border fortresses of Washizu, and Matsudaira forces led by Matsudaira Motoyasu took Marune Fortress. Against this, the Oda clan could rally an army of only 2,000 to 3,000 men. Some of his advisors suggested that he take refuge at Kiyosu Castle and wait out a siege by the Imagawa, but Nobunaga refused, stating that "only a strong offensive policy could make up for the superior numbers of the enemy", and calmly ordered a counterattack against Yoshimoto.

Battle of Okehazama

In June 1560, Nobunaga's scouts reported that Yoshimoto was resting at the narrow gorge of Dengaku-hazama, ideal for a surprise attack, and that the Imagawa army was celebrating their victories over the Washizu and Marune fortresses. While Yoshimoto viewed victory ahead, Nobunaga's forces marched to the Atsuta Shrine, a fortified temple overlooking the Imagawa camp. Later, Nobunaga moved to Zensho-ji fort, set up a decoy army there, marched rapidly behind Yoshimoto's camp, and attacked after a terrific thunderstorm. Yoshimoto was killed by two Oda samurai.  With his victory in this battle, Oda Nobunaga gained greatly in prestige, and many samurai and warlords pledged fealty to him.

This battle was the first time Nobunaga noticed the talents of the sandal-bearer Kinoshita Tōkichirō, who would eventually become Toyotomi Hideyoshi.

Alliance with Matsudaira (later Tokugawa) and Takeda
Rapidly weakening in the wake of this battle, the Imagawa clan no longer exerted control over the Matsudaira clan. In 1561, an alliance was forged between Oda Nobunaga and Matsudaira Motoyasu (who would become Tokugawa Ieyasu), despite the decades-old hostility between the two clans. Nobunaga also formed an alliance with Takeda Shingen through the marriage of his daughter to Shingen's son.

Mino campaign

In 1561, Saitō Yoshitatsu, an enemy of the Oda clan, died suddenly of illness and was succeeded by his son, Saitō Tatsuoki. However, Tatsuoki was young and much less effective as a ruler and military strategist compared to his father and grandfather. Taking advantage of this situation, Nobunaga moved his base to Komaki Castle and started his campaign in Mino Province, defeating Tatsuoki in both the Battle of Moribeand the Battle of Jushijo in June that same year.

By convincing Saitō retainers to abandon their incompetent and foolish master, Nobunaga significantly weakened the Saitō clan. In 1564, Oda Nobunaga dispatched his retainer, Kinoshita Tōkichirō, to bribe many of the warlords in the Mino area to support the Oda clan.  In 1566, Nobunaga charged Kinoshita with building Sunomata Castle on the bank of the Sai River opposite Saitō territory, to serve as a staging point for the Oda forces, and to intimidate, surprise, and demoralize the enemy.

In 1567, the Mino Triumvirate (西美濃三人衆, Nishi-Mino Sanninshū) was commanded by three samurai generals serving the Saitō clan: Inaba Ittetsu, Andō Michitari, and Ujiie Bokuzen. The triumvirate agreed to change sides and join the forces of Oda Nobunaga. Their combined forces mounted a victorious final attack at the Siege of Inabayama Castle. After taking possession of the castle, Nobunaga changed the name of both Inabayama Castle and the surrounding town to Gifu. Nobunaga derived the term Gifu from the legendary Mount Qi (岐山 Qi in Standard Chinese) in China, on which the Zhou dynasty is fabled to have started. Nobunaga revealed his ambition to conquer the whole of Japan, and also started using a new personal seal that read Tenka Fubu (天下布武), literally "All under heaven, spreading military force", or more idiomatically, "All the world by force of arms". Remains of Nobunaga's residence in Gifu can be found today in Gifu Park.

Ise campaign, Omi campaign and march to Kyoto

Following Nobunaga's conquest of Mino Province in 1567, Nobunaga sent Takigawa Kazumasu on a campaign comprising two invasions of Ise Province in 1567 and 1568 that defeated numerous families of Ise. Also in an effort to cement an alliance between Nobunaga and rival warlord Azai Nagamasa from Omi Province, Nobunaga arranged for Oichi, his sister, to marry Nagamasa. Nobunaga desired peaceful relations with the Azai clan because of their strategic position in between the Oda clan's land and the capital, Kyoto. 

In 1568, Ashikaga Yoshiaki and Akechi Mitsuhide, as Yoshiaki's bodyguard, went to Gifu to ask Nobunaga to start a campaign toward Kyoto. Yoshiaki was the brother of the murdered 13th shogun of the Ashikaga Shogunate, Yoshiteru, who had been killed by the Miyoshi sanninshu (three chiefs of the Miyoshi clan, Miyoshi Nagayuki, Miyoshi Masayasu and Iwanari Tomomichi). Yoshiaki wanted revenge against the killers who had already set up a puppet shogun, Ashikaga Yoshihide.  Nobunaga agreed to install Yoshiaki as the new shogun, and grasping the opportunity to enter Kyoto, started his campaign. An obstacle in southern Ōmi Province was the Rokkaku clan, led by Rokkaku Yoshikata, who refused to recognize Yoshiaki as shogun and was ready to go to war to defend Yoshihide. In response, Nobunaga launched a rapid attack of Chōkō-ji Castle, driving the Rokkaku clan out of their castles.  Other forces led by Niwa Nagahide defeated the Rokkaku on the battlefield and entered Kannonji Castle, before resuming Nobunaga's march to Kyoto. Later in 1570, the Rokkaku tried to retake the castle, but they were driven back by Oda forces led by Shibata Katsuie. The approaching Oda army influenced the Matsunaga clan to submit to the future shogun. The daimyō Matsunaga Hisahide kept his title by making this decision to ally his clan with the shogun.

On November 9, 1568, Nobunaga entered Kyoto, drove out the Miyoshi clan, who had supported the 14th shogun and who fled to Settsu, and installed Yoshiaki as the 15th shogun of the Ashikaga Shogunate. However, Nobunaga refused the title of shogun's deputy (Kanrei), or any appointment from Yoshiaki, even though Nobunaga had great respect for the Emperor Ōgimachi.

Unification of Japan (1568–1582)

Conflict with Asakura, Ashikaga and Azai

After installing Yoshiaki as shogun, Nobunaga had evidently pressed Yoshiaki to request all the local daimyō to come to Kyoto and attend a certain banquet. Asakura Yoshikage, head of the Asakura clan and regent of Ashikaga Yoshiaki, refused, an act Nobunaga declared disloyal to both the shogun and the emperor. With this pretext well in hand, Nobunaga raised an army and marched on Echizen. In early 1570, Nobunaga launched a campaign into the Asakura clan's domain and besieged Kanagasaki Castle. This action made a conflict between Nobunaga and shogun Ashikaga Yoshiaki, as their relationship grew difficult, Yoshiaki secretly started an "anti-Nobunaga alliance", conspiring with other daimyō to get rid of Nobunaga. Azai Nagamasa, to whom Nobunaga's sister Oichi was married, broke the alliance with the Oda clan to honor the Azai-Asakura alliance, which had lasted for generations. With the help of the Rokkaku clan, Miyoshi clan, and the Ikkō-ikki, the anti-Nobunaga alliance sprang into full force, taking a heavy toll on the Oda clan. After Nobunaga found himself facing both the Asakura and Azai forces and when defeat looked certain, Nobunaga decided to retreat from Kanagasaki, which he did successfully.

Battle of Anegawa

In July 1570, the Oda-Tokugawa allies laid siege to Yokoyama Castle and Odani Castle. later, the combined Azai-Asakura force marched out to confront Nobunaga. Nobunaga advanced to the southern bank of the Anegawa River. The following morning, on 30 July 1570, the battle between the Oda and the Azai-Asakura forces began. Tokugawa Ieyasu joined his forces with Nobunaga, with the Oda and Azai clashing on the right while Tokugawa and Asakura grappled on the left. The battle turned into a melee fought in the middle of the shallow Anegawa River. For a time, Nobunaga's forces fought the Azai upstream, while the Tokugawa warriors fought the Asakura downstream. After the Tokugawa forces finished off the Asakura, they turned and hit the Azai right flank. The troops of the Mino Triumvirate, who had been held in reserve, then came forward and hit the Azai left flank. Soon both the Oda and Tokugawa forces defeated the combined forces of the Asakura and Azai clans.

In 1573, Nobunaga marched leading 30,000 troops which mainly consisted of the troops of Owari, Mino, and Ise Provinces. He launched the Siege of Ichijōdani Castle and Siege of Odani Castle. Nobunaga successfully destroyed the Azai and Asakura clans by driving them both to the point that the clan leaders committed suicide.

Ikkō-ikki Campaigns

Nobunaga faced a significant threat from the Ikkō-ikki, a resistance movement centered around the Jōdo Shinshū sect of Buddhism. The Ikkō-ikki began as a cult association for self-defence, but popular antipathy against the samurai from the constant violence of the Sengoku period caused their numbers to swell. By the time of Nobunaga's rise to power, the Ikkō-ikki was a major organized armed force opposed to samurai rule in Japan. In August 1570, Nobunaga launched the Ishiyama Hongan-ji War against the Ikkō-ikki, while simultaneously fighting against his samurai rivals. In May 1571, Nobunaga besieged Nagashima, a series of Ikkō-ikki fortifications in Owari Province, beginning the Sieges of Nagashima. However, Nobunaga's first siege of Nagashima ended in failure, as his trusted general Shibata Katsuie was severely wounded and many of his samurai were lost before retreating. Despite this defeat, Nobunaga was inspired to launch another siege, the Siege of Mount Hiei.

Siege of Mount Hiei

The Enryaku-ji temple on Mount Hiei was an issue for Nobunaga. The monastery's  (warrior monks) of the Tendai school were aiding his opponents in the Azai-Asakura alliance and the temple was close to his base of power. In September 1571, Nobunaga preemptively attacked the Enryaku-ji temple, then besieged Mount Hiei and razed it. In the process of making their way to the Enryaku-ji temple, Nobunaga's forces destroyed and burnt all buildings, killing monks, laymen, women, children and eliminating anyone who had previously escaped their attack. It is said that "The whole mountainside was a great slaughterhouse and the sight was one of unbearable horror." This action gained him renown as the "Demon daimyō" or "Devil King".

Siege of Nagashima

After the success of the Siege of Mount Hiei. 
In July 1573, Nobunaga besieged Nagashima for a second time, personally leading a sizable force with many arquebusiers. However, a rainstorm rendered his arquebuses inoperable while the Ikkō-ikki's own arquebusiers could fire from covered positions. Nobunaga himself was almost killed and forced to retreat, with the second siege being considered his greatest defeat.

In 1574, Nobunaga launched a third siege of Nagashima as his general Kuki Yoshitaka began a naval blockade and bombardment of Nagashima, allowing him to capture the outer forts of Nakae and Yanagashima as well as part of the Nagashima complex. The sieges of Nagashima finally ended when Nobunaga's men completely surrounded the complex and set fire to it, killing the remaining tens of thousands of defenders and inflicting tremendous losses to the Ikkō-ikki.

Conflict with Mori

Before death, Mori Motonari had declared himself no friend to Nobunaga, and his successor the young Terumoto openly challenged Nobunaga. It happened that the Môri were to be drawn into the Ishiyama Hongan-ji War, Nobunaga's siege of a religious stronghold in Settsu, which he had begun in 1570.

Siege of Ishiyama Hongan-ji

Simultaneously, Nobunaga had been besieging the Ikkō-ikki's main stronghold at Ishiyama Hongan-ji in present-day Osaka. Nobunaga's Siege of Ishiyama Hongan-ji began to slowly make some progress, but the Mōri clan of the Chūgoku region broke his naval blockade and started sending supplies into the strongly fortified complex by sea. As a result, in 1577, Nobunaga ordered Takigawa Kazumasu to suppress Ikko-ikki at Kii Province, Hashiba Hideyoshi to conquer the Chūgoku region from the Mori clan, before advancing upon the Mori clan in Nagato Province, Akechi Mitsuhide to pacify Tanba Province, Kuki Yoshitaka to support attack from the sea, and Nobunaga eventually blocked the Mōri's supply lines.

In 1580, ten years after the siege of Ishiyama Hongan-ji began, the son of Chief Abbot Kōsa surrendered the fortress to Nobunaga after their supplies were exhausted, and they received an official request from the Emperor to do so. Nobunaga spared the lives of Ishiyama Hongan-ji's defenders, but expelled them from Osaka and burnt the fortress to the ground. Although the Ikkō-ikki continued to make a last stand in Kaga Province, Nobunaga's capture of Ishiyama Hongan-ji crippled them as a major military force.

Conflict with Takeda

One of the strongest rulers in the anti-Nobunaga alliance was Takeda Shingen, who used to be an ally of the Oda clan. At the apex of the anti-Nobunaga coalition, in 1572, Takeda Shingen ordered Akiyama Nobutomo, one of the "Twenty-Four Generals" of Shingen, to attack Iwamura castle. Nobunaga's aunt, Lady Otsuya, conspired against the Oda clan, surrendered the castle to the Takeda and married Nobutomo. From there, the Takeda-Oda relationship declined and Nobunaga started a war against the Takeda clan.

In the same year, Shingen decided to make a drive for Kyoto at the urgings of the shogun Ashikaga Yoshiaki, starting with invading Tokugawa territory. Nobunaga, tied down on the western front, sent lackluster aid to Tokugawa Ieyasu who suffered defeat at the Battle of Mikatagahara in early 1573. However, after the battle, Tokugawa's forces launched night raids and convinced Takeda of an imminent counter-attack, thus saving the vulnerable Tokugawa with the bluff. This would play a pivotal role in Tokugawa's philosophy of strategic patience in his campaigns with Nobunaga. Shortly thereafter, the Takeda forces were neutralized after Shingen died in April of 1573.

Battle of Nagashino

In 1575, Takeda Katsuyori, son of Takeda Shingen, moved to Tokugawa territory, attacked Yoshida castle and later besieged Nagashino Castle. Katsuyori, angered when Okudaira Sadamasa rejoined the Tokugawa, had originally conspired with Oga Yashiro to take the Tokugawa-controlled Okazaki Castle, the capital of Mikawa Province. This plot failed. Tokugawa Ieyasu appealed to Nobunaga for help and Nobunaga personally led an army of about 30,000 men to the relief of Nagashino Castle. The combined force of 38,000 men under Oda Nobunaga and Tokugawa Ieyasu defeated and devastated the Takeda clan with the strategic use of arquebuses at the decisive Battle of Nagashino. Nobunaga compensated for the arquebus' slow reloading time by organizing the arquebusiers and archers in three rows, firing in rotation. Takeda Katsuyori also wrongly assumed that rain had ruined the gunpowder of Nobunaga's forces. This battle was the greatest defeat of the Takeda clan.

The end of the Takeda clan came in 1582, when Oda Nobutada and Tokugawa Ieyasu forces conquered Kai Province. Takeda Katsuyori was defeated at the Battle of Tenmokuzan and then committed seppuku.

End of the Ashikaga Shogunate

After the death of Takeda Shingen in May, 1573, Nobunaga's entry into Kyoto presented him with a situation very different from that from which he had come.  He focused on Ashikaga Yoshiaki, who had openly declared hostility more than once, despite the Imperial Court's intervention. Nobunaga was able to defeat Yoshiaki's forces, and the power of the Ashikaga was effectively destroyed on 27 August 1573, when Nobunaga drove Yoshiaki out of Kyoto and sent him into exile. Yoshiaki became a Buddhist monk, shaving his head and taking the name Sho-san, which he later changed to Rei-o In, bringing the Ashikaga Shogunate to an end.

Imperial Court appointments
After the Ashikaga Shogunate came to end, the authority of the Imperial Court of Emperor Ōgimachi also began to fall.  This trend reversed after Oda Nobunaga entered Kyoto in a show of allegiance that indicated that the Emperor had the Oda clan's support.

In early 1574, Nobunaga was promoted to the Lower Third Rank of the Imperial Court and made a Court Advisor. Court appointments would continue to be lavished on a nearly annual basis, possibly in hope of placating him. Nobunaga acquired many official titles, including Major Counselor, General of the Right of the Imperial Army, and Minister of the Right in 1576. In February 1578 the court made him Grand Minister of State, the highest post that could be given.

Construction of Azuchi Castle

Azuchi Castle was built from 1576 to 1579 on Mount Azuchi on the eastern shore of Lake Biwa in Ōmi Province. Nobunaga intentionally built Azuchi Castle close enough to Kyoto that he could watch over and guard the approaches to the capital. Azuchi Castle's location was also strategically advantageous in managing the communications and transportation routes between Nobunaga's greatest foes - Uesugi to the north, the Takeda in the east, and the Mōri to the west.

Conflict with Uesugi
The conflict of Oda and Uesugi precipitated by Uesugi intervention in the domain of the Hatakeyama clan in Noto Province, an Oda client state. This event provoked the Uesugi incursion, a coup d'état led by the pro-Oda general Chō Shigetsura, who killed Hatakeyama Yoshinori, the lord of Noto and replaced him with Hatakeyama Yoshitaka as a puppet ruler. As a result, Uesugi Kenshin, the head of the Uesugi clan, mobilized an army and led it into Noto against Shigetsura. Consequently, Nobunaga sent an army led by Shibata Katsuie and some of his most experienced generals to attack Kenshin. They clashed at the Battle of Tedorigawa in Kaga Province in 1577.

Battle of Tedorigawa

In November, 1577, The Battle of Tedorigawa took place near the Tedori River in Japan's Kaga Province. Kenshin tricked Nobunaga's forces into launching a frontal attack across the Tedorigawa and defeated him. Having suffered the loss of 1,000 men, the Oda withdrew south. The result was a decisive Uesugi victory, and Nobunaga considered ceding the northern provinces to Kenshin, but Kenshin's sudden death in early 1578 caused a succession crisis that ended the Uesugi's movement to the south.

By 1580, Nobunaga was the most powerful lord in Japan, controlling 20 provinces in central Japan: Owari, Mino, Omi, Iga, Ise, Yamato, Yamashiro, Kawachi, Izumi, Settsu, Echizen, Hida, Kaga, Shinano, Kai, Tango, Harima, Inaba, Tanba and Bizen.

Tenshō Iga War

The  was two invasions of Iga province by the Oda clan during the Sengoku period. The province was conquered by Oda Nobunaga in 1581 after an unsuccessful attempt in 1579 by his son Oda Nobukatsu. The name of the war is derived from the Tenshō era name (1573–92) in which it occurred. Oda Nobunaga himself toured the conquered province in early November 1581, and then withdrew his troops, placing control in Nobukatsu's hands.

Death

By 1582, Nobunaga was at the height of his power and, as the most powerful warlord, the de facto leader of Japan. Oda Nobunaga and Tokugawa Ieyasu finally defeated the Takeda at the Battle of Tenmokuzan, destroying the clan and resulting in Takeda Katsuyori fleeing from the battle before committing suicide with his wife while being pursued by Oda forces. By this point, Nobunaga was preparing to launch invasions into Echigo Province and Shikoku. Nobunaga's former sandal-bearer, Hashiba Hideyoshi, invaded Bitchū Province and laid siege to Takamatsu Castle. The castle was vital to the Mori clan, and losing it would have left the Mori's home domain vulnerable. Mori reinforcements led by Mōri Terumoto arrived to relieve the siege, prompting Hideyoshi to ask in turn for reinforcements from Nobunaga. Nobunaga immediately ordered his leading generals and also Akechi Mitsuhide to prepare their armies, with the overall expedition to be led by Nobunaga. Nobunaga left Azuchi Castle for Honnō-ji, a temple in Kyoto he frequented when visiting the city, where he was to hold a tea ceremony. Hence, Nobunaga only had 30 pages with him, while his son Oda Nobutada had brought 2,000 of his cavalrymen.

Honnō-ji incident

Akechi Mitsuhide, stationed in the Tanba province, led his army toward Kyoto under the pretense of following the order of Nobunaga, but as they were crossing Katsura River, he decided to assassinate Nobunaga for unknown reasons, and the cause of his betrayal is controversial. Mitsuhide, aware that Nobunaga was nearby and unprotected for his tea ceremony, saw an opportunity to act, Mitsuhide announced to his troops that "The enemy awaits at Honnō-ji!" (敵は本能寺にあり, Teki wa Honnō-ji ni ari). On 21 June 1582, before dawn, the Akechi army surrounded the Honnō-ji temple with Nobunaga present, while another unit of Akechi troops were sent to Myōkaku-ji in a coup. Although Nobunaga and his servants resisted the unexpected intrusion, they were soon overwhelmed. As the Akechi troops closed in, Nobunaga decided to commit  in one of the inner rooms. Reportedly his last words were, "Ran, don't let them come in..." referring to his young page, Mori Ranmaru, who set the temple on fire as Nobunaga requested so that no one would be able to get his decapitated head. Ranmaru then followed his lord, with his loyalty and devotion making him a revered figure in Japanese history. Nobunaga's remains were never found, a fact often speculated about by writers and historians. After capturing Honnō-ji, Mitsuhide attacked Nobutada, eldest son and heir of Nobunaga, who also committed suicide.

Later, Nobunaga's retainer Toyotomi Hideyoshi, subsequently abandoned his campaign against the Mōri clan to pursue Mitsuhide to avenge his beloved lord. Hideyoshi intercepted one of Mitsuhide's messengers trying to deliver a letter to the Mōri requesting to form an alliance against the Oda after informing them of Nobunaga's death. Hideyoshi managed to pacify the Mōri by demanding the suicide of Shimizu Muneharu in exchange for ending his siege of Takamatsu Castle, which the Mōri accepted.

Mitsuhide failed to establish his position after Nobunaga's death, and Oda forces under Hideyoshi defeated his army at the Battle of Yamazaki in July 1582; however, Mitsuhide was murdered by bandits while fleeing after the battle. Hideyoshi continued and completed Nobunaga's conquest of Japan within the following decade.

Historical context

The goal of national unification and a return to the comparative political stability of the earlier Muromachi period was widely shared by the multitude of autonomous daimyō during the Sengoku period. Oda Nobunaga was the first for whom this goal seemed attainable. Nobunaga had gained control over most of Honshu before his death during the 1582 Honnō-ji incident, a coup attempt executed by Nobunaga's vassal, Akechi Mitsuhide. Nobunaga was betrayed by his own retainers who set the Honno-Ji temple on fire; then, instead of burning in flames, Oda Nobunaga had committed  to escape the flames. The motivation behind Mitsuhide's betrayal was never revealed to anyone who survived the incident, and has been a subject of debate and conjecture ever since the incident.

Following the incident, Mitsuhide declared himself master over Nobunaga's domains, but was quickly defeated by Toyotomi Hideyoshi, who regained control of and greatly expanded the Oda holdings. Nobunaga's successful subjugation of much of Honshu enabled the later successes of his allies Hideyoshi and Tokugawa Ieyasu toward the goal of national unification by subjugating local daimyō under a hereditary shogunate, which was ultimately accomplished in 1603 when Ieyasu was granted the title of Shogun by Emperor Go-Yōzei following the successful Sekigahara Campaign of 1600. The nature of the succession of power through the three daimyō is reflected in a well-known Japanese idiom:

The changing character of power through Nobunaga, Hideyoshi and Ieyasu is reflected in another well-known idiom:

All three were born within eight years of each other (1534 to 1542), started their careers as samurai and finished them as statesmen. Nobunaga inherited his father's domain at the age of 17, and quickly gained control of Owari Province through . Hideyoshi started his career in Nobunaga's army as an  but quickly rose up through the ranks as a samurai. Ieyasu initially fought against Nobunaga as the heir of a rival daimyō, but later expanded his own inheritance through a profitable alliance with Nobunaga.

Influence

Military
Militarily, Nobunaga changed the way of war was fought in Japan. His  gunners and spear-wielding foot soldiers (who used unusually long spears between 18 and 21 feet which Nobunaga had designed himself) displaced mounted soldiers armed with bow and sword. His  foot soldiers were trained and disciplined for group and mass movements, which replaced hand-to-hand fighting tactics. They wore distinctive uniforms which fostered esprit de corps, with red troops and black troops. 
He was ruthless in battle, pursuing fugitives and killing traitors without compassion. Through his methods, he became the ruler of 20 provinces.

He built iron-plated warships and imported saltpeter to produce gunpowder, while also promoting the manufacture of artillery and ammunition.

Policies
After consolidating military power in provinces he came to dominate, starting with Owari and Mino, Nobunaga implemented a plan for economic development. This included the declaration of free markets (rakuichi), the breaking of trade monopolies, and providing for open guilds (rakuza). Nobunaga instituted  policies as a way to stimulate business and the overall economy through the use of a free market system. These policies abolished and prohibited monopolies and opened once closed and privileged unions, associations and guilds, which he saw as impediments to commerce.  Even though these policies provided a major boost to the economy, they were still heavily dependent on the support of other daimyō. Copies of his original proclamations can be found in Entoku-ji in the city of Gifu.

Nobunaga initiated policies for civil administration, which included currency regulations, construction of roads and bridges. This included setting standards for the road widths and planting trees along roadsides. This was to ease the transport of soldiers and war material in addition to commerce. In general, Nobunaga thought in terms of "unifying factors", in the words of George Sansom.

Culture
Nobunaga initiated a period in Japanese art history known as Fushimi, or the Azuchi-Momoyama period, in reference to the area south of Kyoto. He built extensive gardens and castles which were themselves great works of art. Azuchi Castle included a seven-story Tenshukaku, which included a treasury filled with gold and precious objects. Works of art included paintings on movable screens (byōbu), sliding doors (fusuma), and walls by Kanō Eitoku. During this time, Nobunaga's tea master Sen no Rikyū established key elements of the Japanese tea ceremony.

Nobunaga was also famous for his meibutsu-gari hunt-down and acquisition of famous objects by which he collected tea ceremony objects with famous poetic or historic lineages.

Additionally, Nobunaga was very interested in European culture which was still very new to Japan. He collected pieces of Western art as well as arms and armor, and he is considered to be among the first Japanese people in recorded history to wear European clothes. He also became the patron of the Jesuit missionaries in Japan and supported the establishment of the first Christian church in Kyoto in 1576, although he never converted to Christianity.

Family

Depending upon the source, Oda Nobunaga and the entire Oda clan are descendants of either the Fujiwara clan or the Taira clan (specifically, Taira no Shigemori's branch). His lineage can be directly traced to his great-great-grandfather, Oda Hisanaga, who was followed by Oda Toshisada, Oda Nobusada, Oda Nobuhide, and Nobunaga himself.

Immediate family
Nobunaga was the eldest legitimate son of Oda Nobuhide, a minor warlord from Owari Province, and Tsuchida Gozen, who was also the mother to three of his brothers (Nobuyuki, Nobukane, and Hidetaka) and two of his sisters (Oinu and Oichi).
 Father: Oda Nobuhide (1510–1551)
 Mother: Tsuchida Gozen (died 1594)
 Brothers
 Oda Nobuhiro (died 1574)
 Oda Nobuyuki (1536–1557)
 Oda Nobukane (1548–1614)
 Oda Nagamasu (1548–1622)
 Oda Nobuharu (1549–1570)
 Oda Nobutoki (died 1556)
 Oda Nobuoki
 Oda Hidetaka (died 1555)
 Oda Hidenari
 Oda Nobuteru
 Oda Nagatoshi
 Sisters:
 Oichi (1547–1583)
 Oinu, married Saji Nobukata later married Hosokawa Nobuyoshi

Descendants
Nobunaga married Nōhime, the daughter of Saitō Dōsan, as a matter of political strategy; however, she was unable to give birth to children and was considered to be barren. It was his concubines Kitsuno and Lady Saka who bore his children. Kitsuno gave birth to Nobunaga's eldest son, Nobutada. Nobutada's son Hidenobu became ruler of the Oda clan after the deaths of Nobunaga and Nobutada. His son Oda Nobuhide was a Christian, and took the baptismal name Peter; he was adopted by Toyotomi Hideyoshi and commissioned chamberlain.
Wife: Lady Nohime, daughter of  Saitō Dōsan
Concubines:
Lady Kitsuno
Lady Saka
Kyōun'in
Lady Hijikata
Lady Jitokuin

 Sons
 Oda Nobutada (1557–1582) by Kitsuno
 Oda Nobukatsu (1558–1630) by Kitsuno
 Oda Nobutaka (1558–1583) by Lady Saka
 Hashiba Hidekatsu (1567–1585)
 Oda Katsunaga (died 1582)
 Oda Nobuhide (1571–1597)
 Oda Nobutaka by Kyōun'in, later Toyotomi Takajuro (1576–1602) adopted by Toyotomi Hideyoshi
 Oda Nobuyoshi by Kyōun'in, later Toyotomi Musashimori (1573–1615) adopted by Toyotomi Hideyoshi
 Oda Nobusada (1574–1624) by Lady Hijikata
 Oda Nobuyoshi (died 1609) adopted by Toyotomi Hideyoshi
 Oda Nagatsugu (died 1600)
 Oda Nobumasa (1554–1647, illegitimate child) by Lady Harada, sister of Narada Naomasa
 Daughters
 Tokuhime (1559–1636), by Kitsuno and married Matsudaira Nobuyasu
 Fuyuhime (1561–1641), married Gamō Ujisato
 Hideko (died 1632), married Tsutsui Sadatsugu
 Eihime (1574–1623), married Maeda Toshinaga
 Hōonin, married Niwa Nagashige
 Sannomarudono (died 1603), by Lady Jitokuin, concubine to Toyotomi Hideyoshi, married Nijō Akizane
 Tsuruhime, married Nakagawa Hidemasa
 Oushin by Kyōun'in, concubine of Saji Kazunari
 Ofuri, married Mizune Tadatane
 Marikoji Mitsufusa's wife
 Tokudaiji Sanehisa's wife
 Adopted children:
 Toyama Fujin, married Takeda Katsuyori
 Ashikaga Yoshiaki

Other relatives
One of Nobunaga's younger sisters, Oichi, gave birth to three daughters. These three nieces of Nobunaga became involved with important historical figures. Chacha (also known as Lady Yodo), the eldest, became the mistress of Toyotomi Hideyoshi. O-Hatsu married Kyōgoku Takatsugu. The youngest, O-go, married the son of Tokugawa Ieyasu, Tokugawa Hidetada (the second shogun of the Tokugawa shogunate). O-go's daughter Senhime married her cousin Toyotomi Hideyori, Lady Yodo's son.

Nobunaga's nephew was Tsuda Nobuzumi, the son of Nobuyuki. Nobuzumi married Akechi Mitsuhide's daughter and was killed after the Honnō-ji coup by Nobunaga's third son, Nobutaka, who suspected him of being involved in the plot.

Later descendants
Nobunaga's granddaughter Oyu no Kata, by his son Oda Nobuyoshi, married Tokugawa Tadanaga.

Nobunari Oda, a retired figure skater, claims to be a 17th generation direct descendant of Nobunaga. The ex-monk celebrity Mudō Oda also claims descent from the Sengoku period warlord, but his claims have not been verified.

Honors
 Imperial Court, Senior First Rank (November 17, 1917; posthumous)

The Tutors of young Nobunaga
Hirate Masahide (平手 政秀, 1492 – 25 February 1553). Served the Oda clan for two generations. His original name was Hirate Kiyohide (平手 清秀).
Hayashi Hidesada (林 秀貞, ? – November 21, 1580). He was also known as Michikatsu (通勝). His court title was Sado no Kami.

Sword

Dōjigiri Yasutsuna sword
One of the Five Swords under Heaven (天下五剣) made by Hōki Yasutsuna, this was the legendary sword with which Minamoto no Yorimitsu killed the boy-faced oni Shuten-dōji (酒呑童子) living near Mount Oe. It was presented to Oda Nobunaga by the Ashikaga family and was subsequently in the possession of Toyotomi Hideyoshi and Tokugawa Ieyasu.

Kotegiri Masamune sword
 means " cutter". This name comes from an episode in which Asakura Ujikage cut an opposing samurai's  in the Battle of Toji in Kyoto. Oda Nobunaga gained possession of this sword and had it shortened to its present length.

In popular culture

Nobunaga appears frequently within fiction and continues to be portrayed in many different anime, manga, video games, and cinematic films. Many depictions show him as villainous or even demonic in nature, though some portray him in a more positive light. The latter type of works include Akira Kurosawa's film Kagemusha, which portrays Nobunaga as energetic, athletic and respectful towards his enemies. The film Goemon portrays him as a saintly mentor of Ishikawa Goemon. Nobunaga is a central character in Eiji Yoshikawa's historical novel Taiko Ki, where he is a firm but benevolent lord. Nobunaga is also portrayed in a heroic light in some video games such as Kessen III, Ninja Gaiden II, and the Warriors Orochi series, while in the anime series "Nobunaga no Shinobi" Nobunaga is portrayed as a kind person as well as having a major sweet tooth.

By contrast, in the novel The Samurai's Tale by Erik Christian Haugaard, he is portrayed as an antagonist "known for his merciless cruelty". He is portrayed as evil or megalomaniacal in some anime and manga series including Samurai Deeper Kyo and Flame of Recca. Nobunaga is portrayed as evil, villainous, bloodthirsty, and/or demonic in many video games, such as the Onimusha series, Ninja Master's, Maplestory, Inindo: Way of the Ninja, Atlantica Online, the Samurai Warriors series, the Sengoku BASARA series (and its anime adaptation), and the Soulcalibur series.

Nobunaga has been portrayed numerous times in a more neutral or historic framework, especially in the Taiga dramas shown on television in Japan. Oda Nobunaga appears in the manga series Tail of the Moon, Kacchū no Senshi Gamu, and Tsuji Kunio's historical fiction The Signore: Shogun of the Warring States. Historical representations in video games (mostly Western-made strategy or action titles) include Shogun: Total War, Total War: Shogun 2, Throne of Darkness, the eponymous Nobunaga's Ambition series, as well as Civilization V, Age of Empires II: The Conquerors, Nioh, and Nioh 2. Kamenashi Kazuya of the Japanese pop group KAT-TUN wrote and performed a song titled "1582" which is written from the perspective of Mori Ranmaru during the coup at Honnō temple.

Nobunaga has also been portrayed in fiction, such as when the figure of Nobunaga influences a story or inspires a characterization. In James Clavell's novel Shōgun, the character Goroda is a pastiche of Nobunaga. In the film Sengoku Jieitai 1549, Nobunaga is killed by time-travellers.  The novel and anime series Yōtōden, the novel The Kouga Ninja Scrolls and the anime and manga Basilisk portray Nobunaga as a literal demon in addition to a power-mad warlord.  Nobunaga also appears as a major character in the eroge Sengoku Rance and is a playable character in Pokémon Conquest, with his partner Pokémon being Hydreigon, Rayquaza and Zekrom.

See also

 Azuchi-Momoyama Period
 Sengoku Jidai
 Nobunari Oda

References

Bibliography
 Hall, John Whitney, ed. The Cambridge History of Japan, Vol. 4: Early Modern Japan (1991) table of contents
 Jansen, Marius B. (2000). The Making of Modern Japan. Cambridge: Harvard University Press. , 
 Perkins, Dorothy Encyclopedia of Japan. New York, Roundtable Press, 1991
 Eisenstadt S. N. Japanese Civilization London, University of Chicago Press, 1996
 Morton W. Scott & Olenik J. Kenneth, Japan, Its History and Culture (4th edition). United States, McGraw-Hill company, 1995

External links

 OdaNobunaga.com, a history website dedicated to Oda Nobunaga
 Oda Nobunaga at the Samurai Archive
 The Christian Century in Japan, by Charles Boxer

1534 births
1582 deaths
16th-century Japanese people
Daimyo
Forced suicides
Oda clan
People from Nagoya
People of Muromachi-period Japan
People of Azuchi–Momoyama-period Japan
Japanese atheists
Suicides by seppuku
Warlords
Deified Japanese people